Emily Alone is the third record by folk band Florist, released through Double Double Whammy in 2019. Although Florist is historically a collaboration project, the record was written and recorded solely by Florist member Emily A. Sprague, who also has ambient solo music released under her own name.

Critical reception

Emily Alone was released to critical applause. On Metacritic, it holds a score of 87 out of 100, indicating "universal acclaim", based on five reviews.

References

2019 albums